This is a list of 2014 box office number-one films in China (only Mainland China).

References

See also
List of Chinese films of 2014

China
Box
2014